Taishin Minamide (南出大伸, Minamide Taishin, born 13 April 1996) is a Japanese marathon swimmer. He competed in the 2020 Summer Olympics.

References

1996 births
Living people
Japanese male long-distance swimmers
Olympic swimmers of Japan
Swimmers at the 2020 Summer Olympics
Sportspeople from Wakayama Prefecture
21st-century Japanese people